Domestic violence in Iran is a form of  expressed by one partner or partners against another partner or partners in the content of an intimate relationship in Iran.

National and political culture
In Iran, domestic relations in a couple are regulated by the Civil Code, which constructs marriage as a hierarchic  institution where the husband has authority over his wife.  Article 1105 reads: "In relations between husband and wife; the position of the head of the family is the exclusive right of the husband". The husband is obligated to maintain his wife, but this obligation ceases to exist if the wife does not perform her duties: Article 1108 states: "If the wife refuses to fulfil duties of a wife without legitimate excuse, she will not be entitled to the cost of maintenance".

The nature of domestic violence is complicated by both a national culture and authoritative state that support control, oppression and violence against women. "The government does so by promoting fundamentalist ideas of women as properties of men. It does so by setting up an unequal legal system and not punishing assault even when it has resulted in severe injury or at times even death. The conversation of domestic violence then cannot be simply domestic but begins to take the shape of a systematic violence, fueled by tradition, ignited by religion, encouraged by the dominant authoritarian state, and empowered by poverty and illiteracy."

At the heart of the issue is the belief, rooted in common law, that men are responsible for their household affairs, especially treatment of family members, and should not be subject to intervention by the government.

Iranian feminists believe that women's issues must be further investigated since so many women are facing domestic violence in Iran.  "Religious intellectuals have responded by engaging in reluctant analysis of the way the woman question poses itself in the Iranian context. So far, their analyses fail to take into account the gender implications of the struggle against absolutism and traditional authority. However, the dynamic interaction of the reform project with demands and aspirations of various sectors of Iranian public life will not allow the issue to rest here. Religious intellectuals, in their attempt to recreate essential religious truth in the form of new intellectual concepts and systems, will increasingly have to deal with systemic gender inequalities in a more systematic manner."

There has been some pushback to feminist efforts to reduce domestic violence in Iran by some more conservative elements of Iranian society.  For example, the women's Basij leader, Minu Aslani, opposed efforts to fight domestic abuse in Iran, because she felt that it threatened Iran's traditional values.  Many people in positions of power hold similar opinions, viewing feminist efforts to achieve gender equality as a threat to Islamic principles.

Incidence of domestic abuse in Iran
In his article "Domestic Violence against Single and Married Women in Iranian Society ", 'Azad Moradian' quoted a National Coalition Against Domestic Violence statement regarding the nature of domestic violence:

"The Census Bauru in Iran, an official government agency, has precluded international organizations from performing studies of domestic violence in Iran and has never conducted their own study of violence against women".

The prevalence of domestic violence has been cited as a cause of high rates of suicide, mostly through self-immolation, among Kurdish women in Iran.

World Health Organization study
A World Health Organization (WHO) study in Babol found that within the previous year 15.0% of wives had been physically abused, 42.4% had been sexually abused and 81.5% had been psychologically abused (to various degrees) by their husbands, blaming low income, young age, unemployment and low education.

2004 domestic violence study
In 2004 Dr. Ghazi Tabatabaei, a renowned Iranian sociologist, led a study of domestic violence for a joint project undertaken by the Women's Center for Presidential Advisory,  Ministry of Higher Education and  The Interior Ministry. Other noted scholars, professionals, psychologists and socialists participated in the study of the capital cities in Iran's 28 provinces that resulted after several years in 32 volumes of results.  The findings from questionnaires included the following areas of focus: violence towards women and children,  marriages and remarriages, divorce, the effect of education and work on violence and family issues.

The 32 volume findings are available only to scholars and researchers at the Center for Research in Tehran and have been shared with governmental lawmakers and agencies. The study of Iran, a diverse country of many ethnical and cultural communities, resulted in varied results by province, and particularly different the further that women lived from Tehran, the capital of Iran.  This could be attributed to the lack of higher education, economics, and dominance of religion.

From the study:
 53% married women in Iran are subjected to some kind of domestic violence in the first year of their marriage, either by their husbands or by their in-laws.
 All married women who were participants in this study in Iran have experienced 7.4% of the 9 categories of abuse.
 The more children in a family, the more likely domestic violence will occur towards women.
 9.63% of women in the study reported wishing their husbands would die, as a result of the abuse they have experienced.

Education and activism
Since about 1994 there have been an overwhelming number of Masters' and PH.D thesis written about women's issues due by women in higher education, including universities in Iran.  Because the papers have been unable to result in change or improvements, many universities are now discouraging thesis based upon Iranian women's issues.

Moradian wrote in 2009 that "Human rights organizations, political/humanitarian oppositional groups and advocacy groups for women were the only voices that acknowledged the existence of this widespread phenomenal in Iran and fought for changes in law and education within communities."

Ramezan Shojaei Kiyasari, Fatema Alia, members of the Iranian parliament, represented Iran at the "Regional Seminar for Asian Parliaments" seminar on 'Preventing and responding to violence against women and girls: From legislation to effective enforcement' held in New Delhi, India in 2011.  Mrs. Fatemeh Alia announced that new laws related to violence against women were placed on Iran's parliament agenda.

Laws
Existing laws (Iranian Code of Criminal Procedure articles 42, 43, 66) intend to prohibit violence in the form of kidnapping, gender-based harassment, abuse of pregnant women and "crimes against rights and responsibilities within the family structure," but due to cultural and political culture do not protect women, prosecute their abusers and provide services to victims.

Proposed laws
Laws to better enforce existing laws and protect women against violence were placed on the agenda before the Iranian parliament the week ending 16 September 2011, focusing on both protection and prevention of violence against women, including focus on human trafficking, better protection and services for abuse victims, rehabilitation (especially concerning domestic abuse) and better processes to manage questioning of female offenders.  One of the keys to ultimate success is altering community cultural views regarding the use of violence against women.

See also
 Human rights in Iran

References

Citations

External links
 Judiciary of the Islamic Republic of Iran, High Council For Human Rights
 Women United Nations, See "Violence Against Women" focus area
 Violence That May Never End
 World Health Organization, Violence Against Women fact sheet

Iran
Women's rights in Iran
Family in Iran
Violence against women in Iran